The term ugabhoga refers to a type of vocal piece in Karnatic music, in which the artist elaborates the treatment of raga  characteristics through freestyle verses (typically in the Kannada language) with or without tala.

References

Carnatic music
Vocal music